Stogov (from "" meaning "haystack") is a Russian masculine surname, its feminine counterpart is Stogova. It may refer to
Oleg Stogov (born 1965), Russian football coach and former player
Vladimir Stogov (1930–2005), Russian weightlifter

Russian-language surnames